Eternal Summer may refer to:

Eternal Summer (2006 film), a Taiwanese film directed by Leste Chen
Eternal Summer (soundtrack), soundtrack of the film
Eternal Summer (2015 film), a Swedish film directed by Andreas Öhman